Dr. Leonard Graham Brown MC (6 September 1888 – 23 May 1950) was an ear, nose and throat Surgeon, politician and rugby union international who represented England from 1911 to 1922. He also captained his country.

Early life
Bruno Brown was born on 6 September 1888 in Brisbane.

Rugby union career
Brown made his international debut on 21 January 1911 at St Helen's, Swansea in the Wales vs England match.
Of the 18 matches he played for his national side he was on the winning side on 14 occasions.
He played his final match for England on 21 January 1922 at Cardiff Arms Park in the Wales vs England match.

World War I

He became a lieutenant-colonel in the Royal Army Medical Corps in World War I and was awarded a MC in 1917.

References

1888 births
1950 deaths
English rugby union players
England international rugby union players
Recipients of the Military Cross
Rugby union props
British Army personnel of World War I
Royal Army Medical Corps officers